, also known as Ikeda Nobuteru (池田 信輝), was an Ikeda clan daimyō and military commander under Oda Nobunaga during the Sengoku period and Azuchi–Momoyama periods of 16th-century Japan.
He was a retainer of the famous warlords Oda Nobunaga and Toyotomi Hideyoshi. In his early years, he served Nobunaga, since his mother was a foster mother of Nobunaga.

Early life
His childhood name was Katsusaburō (勝三郎). His father was Ikeda Toshitsune, who served Oda Nobuhide and His mother, Yotokuin was Oda Nobunaga's wet-nurse. There are various theories as to his birthplace (including Owari, Mino, Settsu and Ōmi provinces).
He was one of the four karō at Kiyosu Castle. His official position was Kii-no-kami (紀伊守), or "Governor of Kii Province". His courtesy name was Shōzaburō (勝三郎). He later became a priest, and referred to himself as Shōnyū (勝入).

Military life
In 1557, he defeated Oda Nobuyuki and took Suemori Castle, who was guilty of treason against his brother Oda Nobunaga.

In 1560, he was one of Nobunaga main forces against Imagawa Yoshimoto at the Battle of Okehazama.

In 1567, he participated at Siege of Inabayama Castle against the Saito clan in the first division of Oda Nobunaga's forces along with Shibata Katsuie.

In 1570, he was active in the Battle of Anegawa against Azai-Asakura clan and became the Lord of Inuyama Castle.

In 1571, Tsuneoki took part in the burning Siege of Mount Hiei to subdue the followers of the Ishiyama-Honganji; attacks against the Nagashima Ikkō-ikki.

In 1573, he participated in the Siege of Makishima castle against Ashikaga Yoshiaki. Yoshiaki surrendered, and sending Yoshihiro, his eldest son, as a hostage to Nobunaga.

In 1574, he entered the mountain fortress of Ori Castle in eastern Mino to pin-down Akechi Castle after it was taken by Takeda Katsuyori.

In 1575 he fought in the Battle of Nagashino against the Takeda clan.

In 1577, he took part in the Battle of Tedorigawa against the Uesugi clan.

In 1580, he beat Araki Murashige at Siege of Hanakuma castle, who locked himself in the castle and was given Murashige's domain.

In 1582, he fought in Hashiba Hideyoshi's force at the Battle of Yamazaki after the Incident at Honnō-ji, helping defeat Akechi Mitsuhide. He also in the meeting at Kiyosu Castle to decide upon Nobunaga's successor.

In 1583, he assisted Hideyoshi at Battle of Shizugatake against Shibata Katsuie and was given 130,000 koku in Mino Province, and became the lord of Ōgaki Castle.

In 1584, he fought in the Battle of Komaki and Nagakute on the side of Hideyoshi. He captured Inuyama Castle on his first assault.

Death

In May 1584, during Battle of Komaki and Nagakute, Tsuneoki and his eldest son, Ikeda Motosuke, died in the battle at Nagakute,. His daughter, Ikeda Sen, and his son, Ikeda Terumasa, survived the battle. Ikeda Terumasa succeeded him as the leader of the Ikeda clan.

Family
 Father: Ikeda Tsunetoshi (d. 1538)
 Mother: Yotokuin (1515–1608)
 Wife: Zen'ōin
 Concubines
 Children:
 Ikeda Motosuke (1559–1584) by Zen'ōin
 Senhime married Mori Nagayoshi later married Nakamura Kazuuji
 Ikeda Terumasa by Zen'ōin
 Ikeda Nagayoshi (1570–1614) by Zen'ōin
 Ikeda Nagamasa (1575–1607) by Zen'ōin
 Waka-Mandokoro married Toyotomi Hidetsugu
 Tenkyuin married Yamazaki Iemori
 daughter married Asano Yoshinaga
 daughter married Oda Katsunaga

References

1536 births
1584 deaths
Ikeda clan
Daimyo
Japanese warriors killed in battle
Oda retainers
Toyotomi retainers